Barry Peter Eastgate (10 July 1927 – 15 December 2007) was a New Zealand rugby union player. He played 17 matches for the All Blacks including three internationals.

References

1927 births
2007 deaths
Rugby union players from Nelson, New Zealand
People educated at Westland High School, Hokitika
New Zealand rugby union players
New Zealand international rugby union players
West Coast rugby union players
Canterbury rugby union players
Rugby union props